Kahawennagama Grama Niladhari Division is a Grama Niladhari Division of the Habaraduwa Divisional Secretariat  of Galle District  of Southern Province, Sri Lanka .  It has Grama Niladhari Division Code 148C.

Habaraduwa West  are located within, nearby or associated with Kahawennagama.

Kahawennagama is a surrounded by the Attaragoda, Morampitigoda, Pitidoowa and Thalpe East  Grama Niladhari Divisions.

Demographics

Ethnicity 

The Kahawennagama Grama Niladhari Division has a Sinhalese majority (100.0%) . In comparison, the Habaraduwa Divisional Secretariat (which contains the Kahawennagama Grama Niladhari Division) has a Sinhalese majority (99.7%)

Religion 

The Kahawennagama Grama Niladhari Division has a Buddhist majority (99.9%) . In comparison, the Habaraduwa Divisional Secretariat (which contains the Kahawennagama Grama Niladhari Division) has a Buddhist majority (99.1%)

Grama Niladhari Divisions of Habaraduwa Divisional Secretariat

References